Josef Křepela (22 January 1924 – 1 April 1974) was a Slovak basketball player. He competed in the men's tournament at the 1948 Summer Olympics.

References

1924 births
1974 deaths
Slovak men's basketball players
Olympic basketball players of Czechoslovakia
Basketball players at the 1948 Summer Olympics
Sportspeople from České Budějovice